The men's 300 metre team free rifle was a shooting sports event held as part of the Shooting at the 1912 Summer Olympics programme. It was the third appearance of the event. The competition was held on Thursday, 4 July 1912. Forty-two sport shooters from seven nations competed. The event was won by Sweden, the nation's first victory in the event, improving on a silver-medal performance in 1908. Defending champions Norway reached the podium for the third consecutive time, taking silver this time. Denmark earned its first medal in the men's 300 metre team free rifle with bronze.

Ole Sæther had been a member of Norway's two prior teams as well, so became the first man with three medals in the event. He had been the only man with multiple medals; five others (Albert Helgerud, Gudbrand Skatteboe, Einar Liberg, and Olaf Sæther of Norway and Gustaf Adolf Jonsson of Sweden) each earned their second in 1912.

Background

This was the third appearance of the men's 300 metre team rifle event, which was held 4 times between 1900 and 1920.

South Africa and the Russian Empire each made their debut in the event. Denmark, France, and Norway each made their third appearance, having competed in each edition of the event to date.

Competition format

The competition had each shooter fire 120 shots, 40 shots in each of three positions: prone, kneeling, and standing. The target was 1 metre in diameter, with 10 scoring rings; targets were set at a distance of 300 metres. The six team members' scores were then summed. Thus, the maximum score possible was 7200 points. The scores for the team event were separate from the individual event this time.

Schedule

Results

References

External links
 
 

Shooting at the 1912 Summer Olympics
Men's 300m team